The Peru clawed gecko (Pseudogonatodes peruvianus) is a species of lizard in the Sphaerodactylidae family found in Peru and Colombia.

References

Pseudogonatodes
Reptiles of Colombia
Reptiles of Peru
Reptiles described in 1970
Taxa named by James R. Dixon